Leviticus 19 is the nineteenth chapter of the Book of Leviticus in the Hebrew Bible or the Old Testament of the Christian Bible. It contains laws on a variety of topics, and is attributed by tradition to Moses.

Text 

The original text of Leviticus 19, like the rest of Leviticus, was written in Hebrew. Some of the more ancient Hebrew sources for this chapter, are the Masoretic Text, Dead Sea Scrolls, and Samaritan Pentateuch. There is also a Greek translation known as the Septuagint, from the 3rd century BC. Since the introduction of chapter divisions in the late medieval period, this chapter is divided into 37 verses.

Synopsis
The chapter begins with God giving Moses a message for the Israelites about the need to be holy, to respect parents, and to avoid idolatry (verses 1–4). Next are instructions for peace offerings (5-8), food aid for poor people and foreigners (9-10), and various instructions relating to ethical treatment of others (11-18) and agricultural practices (19). The chapter penalises adulterous relations between a free man and a married female slave (20-22), and restricts the use of fruit from young trees (23-25). The chapter closes with a variety of other regulations on several subjects (26-36) and a general instruction to obey all of God's commands (37). 

The laws of Leviticus 19 are put in no obvious order, and as a result scholars tend to think that the chapter includes a collection of regulations from various sources.

The practice of leaving a portion of crops in the field for poor people or foreigners to use, mentioned in verses 9 and 10, reappears in the second chapter of the book of Ruth.

Golden Rule

Included in this chapter is the Golden Rule, (verse 18) which states,:

Hillel the Elder (c. 110 BC – 10 AD), used this verse as a most important message of the Torah for his teachings. Once, he was challenged by a gentile who asked to be converted under the condition that the Torah be explained to him while he stood on one foot.

Judaism 

In Judaism, the whole chapter is part of the weekly Torah portion (parashah) Kedoshim which comprises Leviticus 19:1-20:27.

In addition, the chapter (or parts of it) is sometimes used as the Torah reading during the afternoon service on Yom Kippur, particularly in Reform Judaism, Reconstructionist Judaism, and Conservative Judaism. In that context, it is used as a substitute for the traditional reading, which is the previous chapter, Leviticus 18.

Decalogue
This chapter contains statements that echo the contents of much of the Ten Commandments (Decalogue).

However, the relationship is not obvious because the wording, much of the precise concept and the order of presentation are different.

See also
 Marry-your-rapist law
 Matthew 22
 Ruth

References

Bibliography

Commentaries on Leviticus

External links
 Jewish translations:
 Vayikra - Leviticus - Chapter 19 (Judaica Press). Hebrew text and English translation [with Rashi's commentary] at Chabad.org
 Christian translations:
 Online Bible at GospelHall.org (ESV, KJV, Darby, American Standard Version, Bible in Basic English)
 Leviticus chapter 19. Bible Gateway

19
Sexuality in the Bible